Papua New Guinea competed at the 1988 Summer Olympics in Seoul, South Korea.

Competitors
The following is the list of number of competitors in the Games.

Athletics

Men

Track events

Women

Track events

Boxing

Sailing

Men

Weightlifting

Men

References 

 Official Olympic Reports

Nations at the 1988 Summer Olympics
1988
1988 in Papua New Guinean sport